Ansariyan Publications is a private publisher located at Qom, Islamic Republic of Iran. The publication house is under the leadership of Mohammad Taghi Ansariyan.   

It started in 1352 in the Persian calendar, 1974 CE.

It specializes in publishing Islamic books in particular Shi'a twelver literature, and after having published for 30 years they have produced several books that have been used as reference materials for other publications.

Most of Ansariyan Publications' works are in English. It has also published books in Arabic, Urdu, Persian, French, Turkish Azerbaijani, Turkish, Russian, Tajikistani, Spanish and German.

How it was founded
The founder had a meeting with Ayatollah Muhammad Husayn Tabataba'i and Professor Mahmoud al-Shihabi and other Ulama and shia scholars on establishing this type of publishing center. The result of the meeting led to the establishment of Ansariyan Publication.

Objectives
The following are objectives of founding the publishing house:
 To spread the unadulterated Islamic teachings in various languages to the global world.
 To liberate the world from confusion, deviation and suspicion about Islam
 To present the real Islam to Muslims and non-Muslims alike.

References

External links
http://www.ansariyan.org/

Islamic publishing companies
Shia organizations
Book publishing companies of Iran